The Rudolstadt-Festival (till 2015 TFF ("Tanz- und Folkfest") Rudolstadt) is a German folk, roots and world music festival. It takes place annually on the first full July weekend in Rudolstadt/Thuringia and lasts from Thursday evening to Sunday night. Until 2010 it was preceded by a special concert on Thursday evening at the Heidecksburg-castle and started officially on Friday evening at the market place of Rudolstadt. 

The Festival is spread across multiple locations of the town of Rudolstadt, including the Heidecksburg-castle, the city center and market place, and the city park "Heinepark", all of which host multiple stages.

In 2016 more than 300 concerts on 20 stages took place during the festival and 90.000 visitors had been coming.

Since July 1994, Ken Hunt has contributed the English-language texts to the festival's annual programme and, subsequently, CD/DVD releases.

References

External links 

Official website (english)
Official website of Rudolstadt

Rudolstadt
World music festivals
Folk festivals in Germany